Kochubey is a Ukrainian surname of Crimean Tatar descent. Notable people with the surname include:

Vasyl Kochubey (1640–1708), Ukrainian nobleman
Viktor Kochubey (1768–1834), Russian statesman of Ukrainian descent

Ukrainian-language surnames